Hymenocallis durangoensis  is a plant species endemic to the Mexican state of Durango. It is a bulb-forming herb with white flowers.

References

durangoensis
Flora of Durango
Plants described in 1978